Dillagi  (The Jest) is a 1949 Indian Bollywood film. It was the fourth highest grossing Indian film of 1949. The film was produced and directed by A. R. Kardar for his "Kardar Productions", and had music composed by Naushad. The film starred Suraiya, and the actor Shyam,. The film co-starred Chandabai, Sharda, Amar and Amir Banu.

The story was a romantic tragedy, and became commercially successful at the box office. The plot was adapted from Wuthering Heights directed by William Wyler. Kardar was to later use a similar theme in Dil Diya Dard Liya (1966).

Cast 
 Suraiya as Mala
 Shyam as Swaroop
 Sharda as Mala's friend
 Sham Kumar as Jyoti
 Amir Bano as Shankari, Swaroop's sister in law
 Agha Mehraj as Biharilal, Mala's father
 Gulam Hasan as Swaroop's brother
 Baby Shyama as Paro, Jyoti's sister
 Gulzar as Swaroop's mother
 M.A. Shah as Swaroop's father
 Chanda Bai as Fake Bride
 Amar as Popatlal, Mala's uncle

Soundtrack
The music was composed by Naushad and it had Shakeel Badayuni as the film songs lyricist. Suraiya's song "Tu Mera Chand" became a popular number, while Mohammed Rafi's "Is Duniya Mein Ae Dilwalo" also became "extremely popular". Two other notable songs termed as "evergreen hits" by Suraiya were, "Char Din Ki Chandni" and "Nirala Mohabbat Ka Dastur Dekha". The singers were Suraiya, Mohammed Rafi, Shamshad Begum, Uma Devi and Shyam.

Song List

References

External links
 

1949 films
1940s Hindi-language films
Films directed by A. R. Kardar
Indian black-and-white films
Indian drama films
1949 drama films
Hindi-language drama films
Films scored by Naushad